Robert Reginald "Rossie" Rosburg (October 21, 1926 – May 14, 2009) was an American professional golfer who later became a sports color analyst for ABC television.

Early years, college
Rosburg was born in San Francisco, California. He played golf as a junior at the Olympic Club, and at the age of 12, he faced the then-retired baseball Hall of Famer, Ty Cobb, in the first flight of the club championship, and beat Cobb 7 and 6. Rosburg says Cobb was gracious in defeat and shook the young Rosburg's hand, but Cobb took so much kidding from the other Olympic Club members that for many years, Rosburg hardly ever saw Cobb back at the club. Rosburg was an outstanding baseball player at Stanford University in Palo Alto, California during the 1940s, and almost chose baseball as a career over golf. He graduated from Stanford in 1949, and turned pro in 1953. He is a member of the Stanford Athletic Hall of Fame.

PGA Tour career
During his career, Rosburg was one of the most consistent top-10 finishers on the PGA Tour. Rosburg won the Vardon Trophy in 1958 for the lowest average score (70.11) on tour that year. Rosburg's career year was 1959, when he finished seventh on the money list and was named to the Ryder Cup team, after winning the PGA Championship and finishing second in the U.S. Open. In 1969, he won the PGA Club Professional Championship. He won six tour events during the course of his career, before moving into semi-retirement after the 1972 season, his most successful financially. That year, he won the Bob Hope Desert Classic by one stroke over Lanny Wadkins.

The 1959 PGA Championship was played at the Minneapolis Golf Club in St. Louis Park, Minnesota. Rosburg won with a 72-hole score of 277 by one stroke over Jerry Barber and Doug Sanders. Rosburg claimed that he won the 1959 PGA Championship without ever hitting a practice shot during that week, except for a few chips and puts. He came close to winning a second major that year, finishing 2nd at the U.S. Open to Billy Casper. He also finished in a three-way tie for 2nd at the 1969 U.S. Open, one stroke behind Orville Moody.

Broadcasting career

After his playing days on the PGA Tour finished in the mid-1970s, Rosburg became a commentator for ABC sports television. He pioneered the now-common practice of roving on the golf course and reporting from the fairways. At the time of his death, he was the longest serving active golf announcer on television, with more than 30 years behind the microphone. He is remembered for his catch phrase, "He's got no chance, Jim", which Rosburg would utter whenever he encountered a golfer who had hit his ball into a seemingly impossible position (usually behind a tree or in deep grass), upon which the player would then produce a miraculous recovery. The "Jim" is in reference to ABC commentator Jim McKay. Rosburg is also credited with helping ABC hire Judy Rankin, who was the first full-time female golf commentator to cover men's events, including the major championships. Rosburg worked nearly three decades as a commentator with Dave Marr, who like Rosburg won a single PGA Championship.

Rosburg died in Palm Springs, California after sustaining a head injury in a fall at an Indio, California restaurant. He was survived by his wife and their three children.

Professional wins (10)

PGA Tour wins (6)

PGA Tour playoff record (1–5)

Other wins (3)
1957 Mexican Open
1959 Utah Open
1969 PGA Club Professional Championship

Other senior wins (1)
1981 Liberty Mutual Legends of Golf (with Gene Littler)

Major championships

Wins (1)

Results timeline

Note: Rosburg never played in The Open Championship.

CUT = missed the half-way cut (3rd round cut in 1960 PGA Championship)
DQ = disqualified
"T" = tied

Summary

Most consecutive cuts made – 7 (twice)
Longest streak of top-10s – 2 (three times)

U.S. national team appearances
Ryder Cup: 1959 (winners)

See also

List of men's major championships winning golfers

References

External links

American male golfers
Stanford Cardinal men's golfers
PGA Tour golfers
Ryder Cup competitors for the United States
Winners of men's major golf championships
Golf writers and broadcasters
Golfers from San Francisco
Accidental deaths from falls
Accidental deaths in California
1926 births
2009 deaths